Lampedusa is the southernmost island of Italy.

Lampedusa may also refer to:

Lampedusa (gastropod), a genus of gastropods
Giuseppe Tomasi di Lampedusa (1896–1957), Italian writer
14846 Lampedusa, a minor planet

See also